The 1960 Stanley Cup Finals was the championship series of the National Hockey League's (NHL) 1959–60 season, and the culmination of the 1960 Stanley Cup playoffs. It was contested between the four-time defending champion Montreal Canadiens, appearing in their tenth consecutive finals, and the Toronto Maple Leafs; it was a rematch of the previous year's finals. The Canadiens won the series, four games to none, for their fifth straight Cup victory, which stands as an NHL record.

Paths to the finals
Montreal swept the Chicago Black Hawks in four games to reach the Final. In the other semi-final, Toronto defeated the Detroit Red Wings four games to two.

Game summaries
Montreal swept the Maple Leafs, outscoring them 15–5, en route to being the first team since the 1952 Detroit Red Wings to go perfect in the playoffs, with Jean Beliveau scoring the game-winning goal in three of the matches. The Red Wings beat both the Leafs and Habs in the 1952 playoffs to set the record.

After the series Rocket Richard retired. He went out with style, finishing with his 34th final-series goal in the third game.

As of 2020, this is the last time a team from Toronto has lost a championship series in any of the "big four" major professional sports leagues. The Leafs would go on to appear in and win four Stanley Cup Finals in the 1960s, these being 1962, 1963, 1964 and their most recent Finals appearance and win in 1967. Since then, the Toronto Blue Jays (who joined Major League Baseball in 1977) have appeared in and won the World Series in 1992 and 1993, while the Toronto Raptors (who joined the National Basketball Association in 1995) appeared in and won the NBA Finals in 2019.

Stanley Cup engraving
The 1960 Stanley Cup was presented to Canadiens captain Maurice Richard by NHL President Clarence Campbell following the Canadiens 4–0 win over the Maple Leafs in game four.

The following Canadiens players and staff had their names engraved on the Stanley Cup

1959–60 Montreal Canadiens

Stanley Cup engraving
 Camile DesRoches, Frank Selke Jr. (Publicity Directors) are part of all six team winning pictures 1953, 1956, 1957, 1958, 1959, 1960. However, their names do not appear on the Stanley Cup.
 Dickie Moore won six Stanley Cups. His name was spelled differently 5 times. 1953, 1957 as Dickie MOORE, 1956 D MOORE, 1958 R MOORE, 1959 RICHARD MOORE, 1960 RICH MOORE. On the Replica Cup, Moore's name appears as DICKIE MOORE in 1953, 1957, 1959, 1960, D. MOORE in 1956, and R. Moore in 1958.
 Jacques Plante won six Stanley Cups. His name was spelled differently 4 times. 1953, 1957, 1960 Jacques Plante, 1956 J Plante, 1958 Jac Plante, 1959 Jacq Plante. On the Replica Cup Plante's name appears as JACQUES PLANTE in 1953, 1957, 1958, 1959, 1960, and J. PLANTE in 1956.
In 1959, the Montreal Canadiens engraved 29 names on the Stanley Cup; only 27 names were engraved on the Cup in 1960. Every person engraved on the Cup in 1960 was included on the Cup with Montreal in 1959. The only changes in the lineup where with Ian Cushnan and Ken Mosdell were no longer with the team, but were playing in the minors. The only other time in Stanley Cup history that no member engraved on the Cup was a first-time winner was in 1972.

Members of Montreal Canadiens Five Straight Dynasty 1956 to 1960
Jean Beliveau, Bernie Geoffrion*, Doug Harvey*, Tom Johnson*, Don Marshall, Dickie Moore*, Jacques Plante*, Claude Provost, Henri Richard, Maurice Richard*, Jean-Guy Talbot, Bob Turner (twelve players), Frank Selke Sr*, Ken Reardon, Toe Blake, Hector Dubois* (four non-players).
 *-Also won the Stanley Cup in 1953. Bernie Geoffrion is the only player who appeared in every game of the Stanley Cup Finals from 1951 to 1960.

See also
 List of Stanley Cup champions

Notes

References

 Podnieks, Andrew; Hockey Hall of Fame (2004). Lord Stanley's Cup. Bolton, Ont.: Fenn Pub. pp 12, 50. 

 
Stanley Cup
Stanley Cup Finals
Montreal Canadiens games
Toronto Maple Leafs games
Stanley Cup Finals
Stanley Cup Finals
Ice hockey competitions in Toronto
1960 in Quebec
1960s in Montreal
Ice hockey competitions in Montreal